Ophthalmitis sinensium is a moth of the family Geometridae first described by Oberthür in 1913. It is found in China, India, Vietnam, Thailand and probably in Sri Lanka.

Its wings are greenish. Hindwing medial line is close to the inner margin of the discal spot. In male genitalia, the uncus has only one pair of lateral processes.

References

Moths of Asia
Moths described in 1913